A Lil' Sumpin' Sumpin' is the fourth studio album by new jack swing group Troop released by Bust It Records on July 22, 1994. It is also the only album that includes just three members.

Track listing
 "Let's Get Warm" — 6:23
 "Break a Dawn" — 5:42
 "Poohnany (Remix)" — 4:16
 "Blowin' My Mind" — 4:48
 "Get It On" — 6:30
 "Get Loose" — 6:21
 "Around" — 4:44
 "That's the Way" — 6:03
 "Miss U" — 5:16
 "Got Me Goin'" — 4:33
 "Do Me" — 4:30
 "Sumpin' to Ride Too" — 2:46

References

1994 albums
Troop (band) albums